Medeea Ana-Maria Marinescu (born 27 May 1974 in Bucharest) is a Romanian film actress. She played the role of Elena in the French films "Je vous trouve très beau"(2006) and Silvia in "Donnant Donnant" (2010)

Her parents worked in cinematography: her father, Ion Marinescu, was a camera operator, and her mother was a cinema make-up artist.
Graduated in 1996 from the Bucharest Theater and Film Academy, in the class of professor Florin Zamfirescu, Medeea Marinescu acted in several films, and in the 2009-2010 season of the Bucharest National Theater she acted in four plays, one of which is The Egoist by Jean Anouilh

External links

http://www.commeaucinema.com/personne/medeea-marinescu,50039 (in French)

References

1974 births
Living people
Romanian child actresses
21st-century Romanian actresses